Statistics of Úrvalsdeild in the 1941 season.

Overview
It was contested by 5 teams, and KR won the championship. KR's Björgvin Schram was the top scorer with 7 goals.

League standings

Results

References

Úrvalsdeild karla (football) seasons
Iceland
Iceland
Urvalsdeild